Zárate may refer to:

Places
 Zárate, Buenos Aires, a port city in Buenos Aires Province, Argentina
 Zárate Partido, a political administrative division in Buenos Aires Province, Argentina
 Zárate–Brazo Largo Bridge, a set of road and railway bridges in Argentina
 Zarate, Álava, a hamlet in Spain
 Zarate, TX, a census-designated place (CDP) in Starr County, Texas, United States

People
 Zárate (surname), list of people with this name